Ram Khamhaeng or Pho Khun Ram Khamhaeng Maharat, also spelled Ramkhamhaeng, was the third king of the Phra Ruang Dynasty, ruling the Sukhothai Kingdom (a historical kingdom of Thailand) from 1279 to 1298, during its most prosperous era. 

He is credited for the creation of the Thai alphabet and the firm establishment of Theravada Buddhism as the state religion of the kingdom.

Birth and name
Ram Khamhaeng was a son of Pho Khun Bang Klang Hao, who ruled as Pho Khun Si Inthrathit, and his queen, Sueang, though folk legend claims his real parents were an ogress named Kangli and a fisherman. He had two brothers and two sisters. The eldest brother died while very young. The second, Ban Mueang, became king following their father's death, and was succeeded by Ram Khamhaeng on his own death.

At age 19, he participated in his father's successful invasion of the city of Sukhothai, formerly a vassal of the Khmer, establishing the independent Sukhothai Kingdom. Due to his courage in the war, he allegedly was given the title "Phra Ram Khamhaeng” or “Rama the Bold”. After his father's death, his brother Ban Mueang ruled the kingdom, assigning Ram Khamhaeng control of the city of Si Satchanalai.

The Royal Institute of Thailand speculates that Ram Khamhaeng's birth name was "Ram" (derived from Rama, the name of the hero of the Hindu epic Ramayana), as his name following his coronation was "Pho Khun Ramarat". Furthermore, the tradition at the time was to give the name of a grandfather to a grandson; according to both the 11th Stone Inscription and the Ayutthaya Chronicles by Prasoet Aksoranit, Ram Khamhaeng had a grandson named "Phraya Ram", and two grandsons of Phraya Ram were named "Phraya Ban Mueang" and "Phraya Ram".

In English, an alternate spelling of his name is Ramkhamhaeng. The title Maharat is the Thai translation of “the Great King”.

Accession

Tri Amattayakun, a Thai historian, suggests that Ram Khamhaeng should have acceded to the throne in 1279, the year he planted a sugar palm tree in Sukhothai. Prasert na Nagara of the Royal Institute speculates that this was a tradition of Tai Ahom monarchs, who planted banyan or sugar palm trees on their coronation day in the hope that their reign would achieve the same stature as the tree. 

The most significant event at the beginning of his reign was the elopement of one of his daughters, Thai: แม่นางสร้อยดาว, RTGS: Mae-nang Soidao, "Lady Soidao" May Hnin Thwe-Da, with the captain of the palace guards, a commoner. The commoner would found the Burmese Hanthawaddy Kingdom and commission compilation of the Code of Wareru, which would provide a basis for the law of Thailand used in Siam until 1908, and in Burma to the present.

Reign
Ram Khamhaeng sent embassies to Yuan China from 1282 to 1323 and imported the techniques to make the ceramics now known as Sangkhalok ceramic ware. He had close relationships with the rulers of nearby city-states, especially Ngam Muang, the ruler of neighboring Phayao (whose wife, according to legend, he seduced), and King Mangrai of Chiang Mai. His campaign against Cambodia left the Khmer country "utterly devastated". 

According to Thai history, Ram Khamhaeng is credited with creating the Thai alphabet (Lai Nangsue Thai) from a combination of the Sanskrit, Pali, and Grantha alphabets.

It is speculated that Ram Khamhaeng expanded his kingdom as far as Lampang, Phrae, and Nan in the north, Phitsanulok and Vientiane in the east, the Nakhon Si Thammarat Kingdom in the south, the Mon kingdoms of what is now Myanmar in the west, and the Bay of Bengal in the northwest.  However, in the mandala political model, kingdoms such as Sukhothai lacked distinct borders, instead being centered on the strength of the capital itself. Claims of Ram Khamhaeng's large kingdom were intended to assert Siamese dominance over mainland Southeast Asia.

Death
According to the Chinese History of Yuan, King Ram Khamhaeng died in 1298 and was succeeded by his son, Loe Thai, though George Cœdès thinks it "more probable" it was "shortly before 1318". Legend states he disappeared in the rapids of the rivers of Sawankhalok. Another possible source states he was slain by a Malay warrior princess named Adruja Sriwijayamala Singha during a battle between Thai and Malay armies, in a campaign to conquer Malay lands that make up a third of modern Thailand today.

Legacy

Ram Khamhaeng Inscription

Much of the traditional biographical information comes from the inscription on the Ram Khamhaeng stele, composed in 1292, and contains vague facts about the king. It is now found in the Bangkok National Museum. The formal name of the stele is the "King Ram Khamhaeng Inscription". It was added to the Memory of the World Register in 2003 by UNESCO.

Sangkhalok ceramic ware

Ram Khamhaeng is credited with bringing the skills of ceramic making from China and laying the foundation of a strong ceramic ware industry in the Sukhothai Kingdom. Sukhothai for centuries was the major exporter of the ceramics known as "Sangkhalok ware" to countries such as Japan, the Philippines, Indonesia, and even to China. The industry was one of the main revenue generators during his reign and long afterwards.

Banknote
The reverse of the 20 Baht note (series 16), issued in 2013, depicts images of the royal statue of Ram Khamhaeng seated on the Manangkhasila Asana Throne, and commemorates the invention of the Thai script by the king.

Honour
Ramkhamhaeng University, the first Thai university with open-door policy with campuses throughout the country, was named after Ram Khamhaeng.

Video games
King Ramkhamhaeng is a playable ruler for the Siamese in Sid Meier's Civilization V. He gets 50% more food and culture from city states as his special ability.

References

 ตรี อมาตยกุล. (2523, 2524, 2525 และ 2527). "ประวัติศาสตร์สุโขทัย." แถลงงานประวัติศาสตร์ เอกสารโบราณคดี, (ปีที่ 14 เล่ม 1, ปีที่ 15 เล่ม 1, ปีที่ 16 เล่ม 1 และปีที่ 18 เล่ม 1).
 ประชุมศิลาจารึก ภาคที่ 1. (2521). คณะกรรมการพิจารณาและจัดพิมพ์เอกสารทางประวัติศาสตร์. กรุงเทพฯ : โรงพิมพ์สำนักเลขาธิการคณะรัฐมนตรี.
 ประเสริฐ ณ นคร. (2534). "ประวัติศาสตร์สุโขทัยจากจารึก." งานจารึกและประวัติศาสตร์ของประเสริฐ ณ นคร. มหาวิทยาลัยเกษตรศาสตร์ กำแพงแสน.
 ประเสริฐ ณ นคร. (2544). "รามคำแหงมหาราช, พ่อขุน". สารานุกรมไทยฉบับราชบัณฑิตยสถาน, (เล่ม 25 : ราชบัณฑิตยสถาน-โลกธรรม). กรุงเทพฯ : สหมิตรพริ้นติ้ง. หน้า 15887-15892.
 ประเสริฐ ณ นคร. (2534). "ลายสือไทย". งานจารึกและประวัติศาสตร์ของประเสริฐ ณ นคร. มหาวิทยาลัยเกษตรศาสตร์ กำแพงแสน.
 เจ้าพระยาพระคลัง (หน). (2515). ราชาธิราช. พระนคร : บรรณาการ.

External links

1298 deaths
13th-century births
Creators of writing systems
Tai history
Kings of Sukhothai
13th-century monarchs in Asia
Thai princes
13th-century Thai people